Milestones... 20 Years is the third compilation and second greatest hits album by Australian recording artist Adam Brand. The album was released on 13 July 2018 and marks the twenty-year anniversary of Brand's debut self-titled studio album and consists of Brand's greatest hits and fan favourites. Milestones... 20 Years peaked at number 6 on the ARIA charts.

The album was supported by the "Milestones... 20 Years" seven month national tour, commencing in Scone, NSW on 27 April 2018 and finishing in Murchison, VIC on 18 November 2018.

Track listing

Charts

Weekly charts

Year-end charts

Release history

References

2018 greatest hits albums
Compilation albums by Australian artists
Adam Brand (musician) albums